"Little Arabella Miller" is an English nursery rhyme often sung in pre-schools. Most references to the song do not attribute a writer but Ann Eliott has been previously cited as a composer. It is also an action song, sung to the tune of "Twinkle Twinkle Little Star".

Lyrics
The rhyme has just one verse but there are several variants which focus on the description of the caterpillar (furry, fuzzy, woolly), and on the family members mentioned in the rhyme (mother, brother, grandmother, baby brother).

A version sung in England:

Other versions:

Actions

Another variation on the action song:

References

External links
Rhyme spoken in English

English folk songs
English children's songs
Traditional children's songs
Songs about fictional female characters
Songs about insects
English nursery rhymes
Action songs